Gymnosoma amplifrons is a Nearctic species of fly in the family Tachinidae.

References

Phasiinae
Diptera of North America
Insects described in 1946